Kenneth Pettiford (born July 9, 1950) is a former American college football player and coach. He served as the head coach at Mississippi Valley State University (MVSU) from 1987 to 1989, Alabama Agricultural and Mechanical University (AAMU) from 1995 to 1997, and Savannah State University (SSU) from 2002 to 2003, compiling a career college football coaching record of 25–54. He currently works as a video production assistant at the Tennessee Titans games.

Coaching career

Mississippi Valley State
Pettiford was the 11th head football coach at Mississippi Valley State University in Itta Bena, Mississippi and he held that position for three seasons, from 1987 until 1989.  His coaching record at Mississippi Valley State was 5–2.

Alabama A&M
Pettiford served as head coach of the Bulldogs from 1995 to 1997 and compiled a 19–14 record.

Savannah State
Pettiford became the 19th head football coach for the Tigers in 2002. In Pettiford's first season as head coach, the Tigers compiled a 1–9 record. Pettiford was fired following the fifth game of the 2003 season with a 0–5 record.

Head coaching record

Notes

References

1950 births
Living people
American football quarterbacks
Alabama A&M Bulldogs football coaches
Albany State Golden Rams football coaches
Alcorn State Braves football coaches
Jackson State Tigers football coaches
Mississippi Valley State Delta Devils football coaches
Savannah State Tigers football coaches
Tennessee State Tigers football players
Players of American football from Nashville, Tennessee
Sportspeople from Nashville, Tennessee
African-American coaches of American football
African-American players of American football
20th-century African-American sportspeople
21st-century African-American sportspeople